Axmansford is a village in Hampshire, England. It is in the civil parish of Baughurst.

External links

Villages in Hampshire